Sigma Phi Alpha is a national honorary society serving the field of dental hygiene.

History
The Society originated at the March 1958 Business Meeting of the Dental Hygiene Education section of the  American Dental Education Association (now American Dental Education Association). Constitution and Bylaws were accepted and Supreme Chapters officers were elected and empowered to see the organization of component chapters in schools with programs in Dental/Oral Hygiene.

Most of the society's 139 chapters are in the United States, divided into three geographical regions. One chapter has been installed in Canada, at the University of Manitoba.

Insignia
 Emblem: Rectangular Keypin with the Greek letters  in a diagonal arrangement from upper left to lower right.

Associations
Sigma Phi Alpha and Omicron Kappa Upsilon (Honorary in Dentistry) organize a joint symposium every other year at the American Dental Education Association annual meetings.

References

See also
 Delta Sigma Delta
 Xi Psi Phi
 Psi Omega
 Alpha Omega
 Omicron Kappa Upsilon
 List of dental schools in the United States
 List of defunct dental schools in the United States

Dental organizations based in the United States
Honor societies
Student organizations established in 1958
1958 establishments in Michigan